Alva is a unisex given name. It is used in Sweden and Norway as a feminine form of the name Alf, meaning "elf." It is also a spelling variant of the Biblical masculine name Alvah, meaning "his highness." Alva is a currently popular name in Sweden, where it was ranked among the ten most popular names given to newborn girls in 2012. Notable people with the name include:

Men
Alva Adams (governor) (1850–1922), Governor of Colorado
Alva B. Adams (1875–1941), U.S. Senator from Colorado, son of the governor
Alva Baptiste, Saint Lucian politician
Alva Ted Bonda (1917–2005), president and part-owner of the Cleveland Indians Major League Baseball team
Alva Bradley (1884–1953), American businessman and baseball executive
Alva M. Cummins (1869–1946), American lawyer
Alva Duer (1904–1987), American college basketball coach
Alva R. Fitch (1907–1989), United States Army lieutenant general
Alva Clark Forney (1871–1956), Lieutenant Governor of South Dakota (1925–1927)
Alva Garey (1883–1971), American politician
Alva L. Hager (1850–1923), three-term U.S. Representative from Iowa
Alva Johnston (1888–1950), Pulitzer Prize-winning journalist, author and biographer
Alva Kelley (1918–1999), American collegiate football player and coach
Alva Liles (1956–1998), American football player
Alva M. Lumpkin (1886–1941), U.S. Senator from South Carolina for less than a month
Alva Hugh Maddox (1930–2020), a justice of the Supreme Court of Alabama from 1969 to 2001
Alva Noë (born 1964), American philosopher and cognitive scientist
Alva Allie Paine (1919–2008), American basketball player
Alva Ross (1928–2004), Jamaican politician

Women
Alva Belmont (1853–1933), American socialite and suffragette
Alva Challis (1930 – 2010), Welsh-born New Zealand geologist
Alva Colquhoun (born 1942), Australian swimmer
Alva C. Ellisor (1892–1964), American geologist, one of the first female stratigraphers in North America
Alva Forsius (1866–1935), Finnish midwife, social worker and a founding member of the Finnish Salvation Army
Alva Myrdal (1902–1986), Swedish Nobel Peace Prize winner

References

Unisex given names